Valentin Dujacquier (born 23 July 1989), is a Belgian futsal player who plays for FP Halle-Gooik and the Belgian national futsal team.

References

External links
 
 UEFA profile
 Futsalteam profile

1989 births
Living people
Belgian men's futsal players